The Housing, Town Planning, &c. Act 1919 (c 35) was an Act of the Parliament of the United Kingdom. It was also known as the Addison Act after Minister of Health, Christopher Addison, who was Minister for Housing. The Act was passed to allow the building of new houses after the First World War, and marked the start of a long 20th-century tradition of state-owned housing in planned council estates.   A separate Act was passed for Scotland.

Background
The 1919 Act followed on from the Town Planning Act 1909 and the 1917 Tudor Walters Committee Report into the provision of housing in the United Kingdom; the latter commissioned by Parliament with a view to postwar construction. In part, it was a response to the shocking lack of fitness amongst many recruits during World War I, which was attributed to poor living conditions. That belief summed up in a housing poster of the period that "you cannot expect to get an A1 population out of C3 homes", in reference to the period's military fitness classifications.

Terms
It provided subsidies to local authorities and aimed to help finance the construction of 500,000 houses within three years.

Section 41 (1) provided that the London County Council could build houses outside the County of London. The provision was used to build 'out-county' estates, such as Becontree.

Results
Not all of the funding was ultimately made available, and only 213,800 homes were built under the 1919 Act scheme. However, under the provisions of successive Housing Acts between 1919 and 1939, local authorities built a total of 1.1 million homes.

See also
English land law
Boot house

References

United Kingdom Acts of Parliament 1919
Public housing in the United Kingdom
Local government legislation in England and Wales
Acts of the Parliament of the United Kingdom concerning England and Wales
Public housing in England
1919 in England
1919 in Wales
United Kingdom planning law
Housing in the United Kingdom